"You Stay" is a song by American record producer DJ Khaled, featuring guest vocals from Colombian singer J Balvin and American musicians Meek Mill, Lil Baby, and Jeremih. Released on May 17, 2019, it is the fifth single from Khaled's eleventh studio album Father of Asahd (2019).

Composition
The song samples "No Me Conviene" by Puerto Rican singer India and interpolates "Señorita" by American rapper Puff Daddy, which also samples the song. Jeremih sings the hook and a verse, with Meek Mill, Lil Baby and J Balvin provide verses. Lyrically, they ask women why they are still loyal to them when their significant other has not treated them well.

Music video
A music video for the song was released on May 18, 2019. It was directed by DJ Khaled, Eif Rivera, and Ivan Berrios, and shows a party at Khaled's mansion in Miami, where the artists hang out surrounded by women. The artists are shown "strutting through the home's marble floors, poolside, and courtyard, all wearing an assortment of colorful suits." The video features a cameo from Turkish butcher Salt Bae, who launches a slice of meat into Khaled's mouth.

Charts

Certifications

References

2019 singles
2019 songs
DJ Khaled songs
Meek Mill songs
J Balvin songs
Lil Baby songs
Jeremih songs
Songs written by DJ Khaled
Songs written by Meek Mill
Songs written by J Balvin
Songs written by Lil Baby
Songs written by Jeremih
Songs written by Sergio George
Epic Records singles
Sony Music singles